Billbergia alfonsi-joannis is a species of bromeliad in the flowering plant genus Billbergia. This species is endemic to southeastern Brazil, from Espírito Santo to Santa Catarina.

Cultivars 
 Billbergia 'Alligator'
 Billbergia 'Arctic Queen'
 Billbergia 'Desiree'
 Billbergia 'Gold Dust'
 Billbergia 'Jingle Bells'
 Billbergia 'Manta Ray'
 Billbergia 'Pink Floriate'
 Billbergia 'Satin Lady'
 Billbergia 'Satin Magic'
 Billbergia 'Satin Queen'
 Billbergia 'Snowflake'
 Billbergia 'Swordfish'

References 

alfonsi-joannis
Endemic flora of Brazil
Flora of the Atlantic Forest
Flora of Espírito Santo
Flora of Santa Catarina (state)
Plants described in 1952
Endangered flora of South America